Stretford High School is an 11-16 non-selective secondary school in the borough of Trafford, Manchester. The school has working partnerships with both Manchester City and Lancashire County Cricket Club.

Admissions 
The school has 780 pupils on roll who reflect the multi-cultural mix that is the north of Trafford.

History 
Stretford High School in its current form dates from 1990. Previously the site was host to Stretford Grammar School for Boys, in 1986 it merged with Stretford Grammar School for Girls to become Stretford Grammar School, moving onto the girls' school site and vacating the Great Stone Road site.

On Friday 8 July 2011 Stretford High School pupils in conjunction with Sir Bobby Charlton and Dickie Bird MBE unveiled blue plaques dedicated to Tommy Taylor and Duncan Edwards, two of the Busby Babes who lived in the locality and died in the Munich air disaster in 1958.

Academic performance 
 2010 examination results:
 45% of pupils achieved five or more passes at A*-C including English & Mathematics
 80% of pupils achieved five or more passes at A*-C
 100% of pupils achieved a level 2 qualification

In its most recent Ofsted inspection Stretford High School was rated as 'Good'.

Head teachers 
2015-: Mrs Nicola Doward
2015: Miss Lindsay Brindley
2011–2015: Mr James Haseldine
2009-2010: Mr Eddie Malone
2005-2009: Mr Derek Davies

References 

Educational institutions established in 1990
Secondary schools in Trafford
1990 establishments in England
Stretford
Foundation schools in Trafford